Canary wood or canary whitewood is a name used to a number of species:

 From Liriodendron commonly known as tulip trees
 Indian mulberry Morinda citrifolia
 Wood from the genus Centrolobium
 Wood from the genus Persea; Persea indica and (Apollonias barbujana Syn.: Persea canariensis)
 Wood from Eucalyptus moluccana and Nauclea orientalis Leichhardt's pine or cheesewood, from Australia its also named canary wood

Canary wood typically has a yellowish color with streaks of orange red and even white and black. Often used when making fine wood pens.